The 2019 Canterbury Cup NSW season was the eleventh season of the New South Wales Cup, the top rugby league competition administered by the New South Wales Rugby League. The competition acts as a second-tier league to the ten New South Wales-based National Rugby League clubs, as well the Canberra Raiders and New Zealand Warriors. The Newtown Jets won the premiership and played against Burleigh Bears, who won the 2019 Intrust Super Cup, in the NRL State Championship.

Teams 
In 2019, 12 clubs fielded teams in the Canterbury Cup. The South Sydney Rabbitohs will enter their own team, and the North Sydney Bears will become the reigning premiers Sydney Roosters' new feeder club.

The Jersey Flegg Cup competition will be run in parallel to the New South Wales Cup.

Results

Ladder

Finals Series

Television Broadcast 
Fox League and Channel 9 will continue their broadcast of the Canterbury Cup. Channel 9 will be moving their weekly game from Saturday to Sunday to move between their broadcast of the Sunday Footy Show and their Sunday Afternoon NRL Broadcast for the NSW market, whilst in QLD they will broadcast an Intrust Super Cup match.

Radio Broadcast 
The Canterbury Cup is presented every weekend on Steele Sports.

References 

New South Wales Cup
2019 in Australian rugby league
2019 in New Zealand rugby league